= Stefan Kiesbye =

German-American novelist and poet

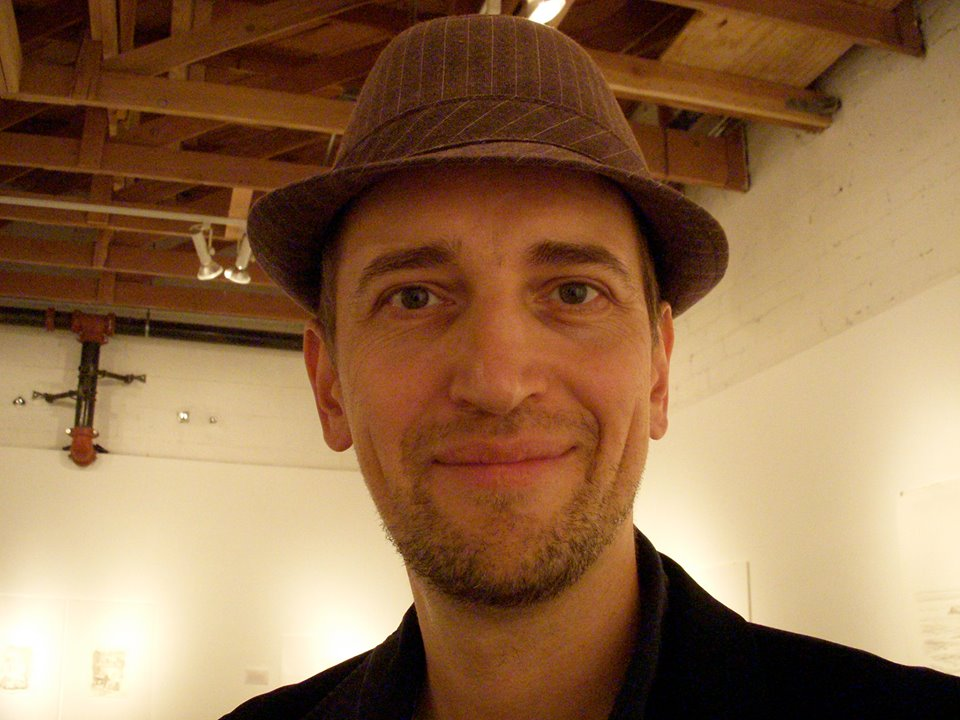

Stefan Kiesbye is a German-American novelist and poet. His first novel, Next Door Lived a Girl won the Low Fidelity Press Novella Award. The German edition was a KrimiWelt Top Ten crime novel pick for four consecutive months. The book has also been translated into Dutch, Spanish and Japanese. His second novel, Your House Is on Fire, Your Children All Gone was a Top Ten pick of Oprah Magazine, made Entertainment Weekly’s Must List, and was named one of the best books of 2012 by Slate editor Dan Kois. Kiesbye's stories, essays, and reviews have appeared in The Wall Street Journal, Publishers Weekly, and the LA Times, among others.

Kiesbye earned an MFA in creative writing from the University of Michigan. He currently teaches creative writing at Sonoma State University.

== Bibliography ==
- 2004: Next Door Lived a Girl (novel) Low Fidelity Press. ISBN 978-0-9723363-2-1
  2012: Your House Is on Fire, Your Children All Gone (novel) Penguin Books. ISBN 978-0-14-312146-6
  2014: Messer, Gabel, Schere, Licht ("Knives, Forks, Scissors, Flames") (novel) Klett-Cotta Verlag / Tropen
  2015: Fluchtpunkt Los Angeles ("Vanishing Point Los Angeles") novel) ars vivendi Verlag
  2015: The Staked Plains (novel) Saddle Road Press. ISBN 978-0-9913952-7-9
  2016: Knives, Forks, Scissors, Flames (novel) Panhandler Books. ISBN 978-0-9916404-2-3
  2017: Cover Stories (anthology) Volt Books. ISBN 978-0-9988072-0-1
  2018: Berlingeles (novel) Revelore Press. ISBN 978-1-947544-08-6
  2022: But I Don't Know You (novel) Saddle Road Press. ISBN 978-1-7365258-5-2
  2022: No Sound to Break, No Moment Clear (novel) Brighthorse Books. ISBN 978-1-944467-31-9
  2025: The Nine Thoughts (novella) Broken Tribe Press. ISBN 978-1-965412-15-2
